Chaharbagh District is a former district in Savojbolagh County, Alborz province, Iran. At the 2006 census, the district's population was 61,135 in 15,380 households, when the county was a part of Tehran province. At the latest census in 2016, the population of the district had increased to 77,409 in 23,430 households, by which time Savojbolagh County had become a part of recently established Alborz province. Chaharbagh District was separated from the county on 16 December 2019 to become Chaharbagh County.

References 

Savojbolagh County

Populated places in Alborz Province

Populated places in Savojbolagh County